The Meridian International Center is a non-partisan, non-profit, public diplomacy center headquartered in Washington, D.C. in the historic Meridian House and White-Meyer House, both designed by John Russell Pope. Founded in 1960, the organization’s mission is to strengthen engagement between the U.S. and the world to find solutions to our shared global challenges through global leadership, diplomacy and culture. For over 60 years, the organization has partnered with the U.S. government, businesses and the diplomatic community to champion its three core pillars.

History 
The organization was first known as the Washington International Center in 1949 to provide educational and cultural opportunities for international visitors in the United States. On October 24, 1959, Dr. Arthur S. Adams, President of the American Council on Education, proposed to the Ford Foundation to covert Meridian House into their main headquarters. The organization relocated to Meridian House in February 1960. By 1961, The Foreign Student Service Council, Governmental Affairs Institute, Institute of Contemporary Arts and the Institute of International Education joined the Center. The American Council on Education passed the title of the Meridian House to the Meridian House Foundation, serving as a nonprofit, cultural, educational and scientific institution in cooperation with the Washington International Center. In 1974, the U.S. Department of State approved the Meridian House Foundation to implement what is now known as the International Visitor Leadership Program. Under the leadership of Ambassador Joseph John Jova, the Foundation was overseeing five affiliate organizations in 1977. The organization created original programs emphasizing the importance of two-way international exchange and cultural diplomacy coining the Foundation as “a doorway to the United States for thousands of international visitors, and a window to the world for Americans.” The Meridian House became one of Washington’s first intercultural campuses dedicated to the spirit of global leadership, cultural exchange and diplomacy. The organization conjoined the Meridian House and White-Meyer House grounds from the Eugene and Agnes E. Meyer Foundation in 1987. In June 1992, Meridian House Foundation voted to change its name to Meridian International Center. From 1989 to 2006, Ambassador Walter Cutler was President of the Meridian International Center. In 2006, Ambassador Stuart Holliday became President and CEO of the organization.

Programmatic Pillars 
With over 500 projects per year, Meridian's programs and conferences fall in to three different categories: global leadership, diplomacy and culture.

Global Leadership 

Meridian International Center annually hosts over 4,000 emerging global leaders for exchange and training programs ranging from cybersecurity, women’s economic empowerment, sustainability and countering violent extremism. Visiting leaders gain the insight, networks and cultural context needed to navigate global challenges and opportunities. The U.S. Department of State is the organization’s primary partner on these programs in addition to partnering with the private sector, U.S. embassies abroad and the diplomatic corps in Washington, D.C. to develop several programs. Alumni include over 180 Heads of State.

Diplomacy 
Meridian International Center connects government, business and diplomatic leaders to exchange perspectives and accelerate collaboration on a range of global issues, from trade to national security, technology and healthcare issues while closing the gaps among these sectors.

Culture 
Meridian International Center views arts and culture as tools of diplomacy to connect people around the world and bridge divides. The organization has partnered with the U.S. Department of State, U.S. embassies abroad and the diplomatic communities in Washington, D.C. and abroad to develop and curate exhibitions, exchanges and programs that range from film screening to mural arts programs to hip-hop music performances.

Centers and Councils 
Within the organization's three pillars are four centers.

Meridian Center for Global Leadership 

The Meridian Center for Global Leadership (MCGL) administers professional and educational exchange programs that enhance the organization’s vision of a more secure and prosperous world. MCGL’s virtual and in-person programs provide training networking, and professional development opportunities to emerging leaders from around the globe.  

The organization’s tailored exchange programs allow leaders from around the world to connect with their American counterparts and collaborate on solutions to challenges facing their communities, organizations, and countries. The organization’s programs support key global issues and sectors, including business and trade, women's empowerment, journalism, youth leadership and civic engagement, human rights and energy and the environment. 

This integrated programming approach provides leaders with a variety of platforms in neutral environments to develop an informed global view, cultural awareness, and collaborative peer networks to produce better outcomes. The organization works with governments, the private sector, and the diplomatic community to develop international exchange and training programs to build mutual understanding and help leaders better address global challenges and opportunities.

Training 
Meridian International Center’s custom training programs combine practical tools with expertise from the organization’s network, ensuring private and public sector partners are equipped to navigate global challenges and opportunities. The organization develops training programs that are tailored to individual program requirements for leadership development to connect people with issues as well as with broader global networks which are accomplished through instruction and experiential learning. Meridian International Center designs custom training that can incorporate a variety of client needs – classroom, experiential, or both. In addition, the organization brings cultural and corporate programming and engagement into its training programs to develop global leaders who are both intellectually and artistically aware on a global level.

Meridian Center for Diplomatic Engagement 
The Meridian Center for Diplomatic Engagement (MCDE) works with the diplomats, private sectors and American policymakers to create bespoke policy discussions, workshops and trainings that provide Ambassadors and the diplomatic community opportunities to build key relationships, exchange perspectives and frame the political, social and economic context driving business and U.S. government policies. The organization annually produces more than 100 roundtable discussions, conferences, seminars, programs, policy discussions, and other neutral convening that bring together the world’s top private and public sector leaders, and the diplomatic corps.

Diplocraft program series 
This MCDE series provides diplomats with a better understanding of the inner workings of Washington D.C. and deep dives into policy areas through curated, bespoke convening experiences in the form of panel discussions and roundtable conversations.

Insights@Meridian program series 
This MCDE series is designed to provide ambassadors and other senior diplomats the opportunity to hear directly from Administration leaders, Members of the United States Congress, and business visionaries on vital policy issues.

DiplomacyRISE initiative 
Created in April 2021, the DiplomacyRISE (Readiness, Innovation, Skill, and Equity) initiative is a diplomatic professional development program that provides greater access to critical skills training, career guidance networks and emerging issue expertise to cultivate the next generation of U.S.  diplomats that reflect America’s diversity and are equipped with 21st-century statecraft skills and knowledge DiplomacyRISE is the organization’s investment and solution into strengthening America’s foreign affairs ecosystem by developing the next generation of diplomats – an inclusive professional development initiative providing college students and young professionals with greater access to critical skills training, career guidance networks and emerging issue area expertise.

Meridian Center for Cultural Diplomacy 
The Meridian Center for Cultural Diplomacy (MCCD) employs arts and culture as an effective tool of diplomacy and cross-cultural understanding. MCCD is the U.S. Department of State’s trusted partner in reaching audiences through cultural diplomacy activities while enhancing U.S. public diplomacy efforts and national interests abroad. From vibrant visual art displays to film screenings, delegations and concerts, the organization’s cultural programs aim to strengthen relationships around the world by bringing together people from diverse communities to celebrate shared interests and common values.  MCCD’s exhibitions, in addition to cultural exchanges ranging from murals to hip-hop to theatre arts, create impactful and positive impressions of the United States to bolster our country’s global engagement. These exhibitions have reached millions of people in more than 310 cities in 79 countries worldwide.

Exchanges and Exhibitions 
Meridian International Center’s cultural programs advance diplomacy goals by providing a common language that breaks down barriers and brings together the public through shared interests and values. MCCD programs have reached more than 260 cities in 60 countries worldwide. MCCD exhibitions in addition to our cultural exchanges, ranging from murals and hip hop to circus arts, create positive impressions of the United States and are more important than ever to strengthen relationships and increase mutual understanding in this geopolitical environment.

Councils

Meridian Corporate Council 
The Meridian Corporate Council provides a platform for exchange, dialogue, and networking on key global issues among diplomatic, public, private and nonprofit sector leaders. The Meridian Corporate Council continues to serve as a prime channel for its members to partner with Meridian on a variety of programs, roundtable discussions, dialogues, salon dinners, and conferences, focused on current issues relevant to the global business community.

Meridian Council 
The Meridian Council is a global network of leaders and advisors who believe that we are stronger at home when globally engaged. Council members provide vital support that helps strengthen international capacity to solve the global challenges of our times. Through exchanges with senior and rising leaders in government, the foreign diplomatic corps, the arts, and the private sector, Meridian International Center helps build a more just society, greater international security, and more inclusive prosperity for all people. 

Meridian Council members engage with our mission and programs through specially curated programs throughout the year. From discussions on foreign policy issues at intimate salon dinners in embassies to lively cultural diplomacy receptions, these programs focus on cultivating relationships with the diplomatic community and impactful exchanges of ideas and culture from around the world.  Members are selected from across the government, corporate, diplomatic, and NGO sectors, and shape an annual agenda that includes salon dinners, networking events, and invitations to relevant foreign policy events in Washington D.C.

Notable Exchanges

International Visitor Leadership Program (IVLP) 
For more than 60 years, Meridian has been a principal partner in implementing the International Visitor Leadership Program (IVLP) — the U.S. Department of State’s premier professional exchange. Launched in 1940, the program, which invites over 4,000 distinguished visitors to the U.S. every year, is funded by the Bureau of Educational and Cultural Affairs. The Meridian International Center administers roughly 40 percent of all IVLP projects annually and has been in partnership or this program since 1974. 

Over the course of Meridian’s long history with the IVLP, as U.S. foreign policy priorities have shifted in reaction to global events, we have adapted, maintaining a strong partnership with the State Department on these critical exchanges.

Pan-Africa Youth Leadership Program (PAYLP) 
Founded in 2014, the Pan-Africa Youth Leadership Program (PAYLP) is a leadership development exchange program that brings together anglophone and francophone high school students and adult mentors for practical leadership and technical skills training centered around an action-planning curriculum & capstone. The program is catered for African students and adult mentors in two cohorts spanning 35 to 40 African countries.

British American Parliamentary Group (BAPG) 
Administered as part of the U.S. Department of State’s International Visitor Leadership Program (IVLP), the British American Parliamentary Group (BAPG) exchange has been connecting representatives from across the Atlantic since 1977. Founded in 1937 in partnership with the Department of State, British members of parliament (MP) are welcomed to the U.S. to take part in an intensive ten-day exchange. These exchanges seek primarily to strengthen U.S.-U.K. relations and educate parliamentarians on the U.S. federalist system of government. BAPG is co-funded by the Department of State and a “Grant-in-Aid” from the His Majesty’s Treasury.

Study of the U.S. Institutes (SUSI) for Global Leaders 
In partnership with the U.S. Department of State, Meridian International Center welcomes over 120 international undergraduate student leaders each year to engage with U.S. culture and develop global leadership skills through the Study of U.S. Institutes (SUSI) for Global Student Leaders program. The SUSI program is founded on a belief in the unlimited potential of intercultural exchanges to promote leadership and entrepreneurship skills in young leaders. Students experience an in-depth investigation into program themes and enhance their understanding of American values.

NextLevel 
One of MCCD’s largest programs for the United States Department of State is NextLevel, a hip-hop diplomacy exchange program managed in partnership with the University of North Carolina at Chapel Hill. The program’s mission is to use hip-hop music, dance, and art to foster cross-cultural creative exchange in diverse communities. NextLevel programs focus on promoting conflict transformation and interacting with younger and underserved audiences around the world. This is achieved through musical entrepreneurship, conducting workshops and discussions on global music business practices today. The program has brought over 130 U.S. hip-hop artists and art educators to 36 countries to work with over 2,300 international participants. MCCD also supports the diplomatic community and private sector through customized exchanges, cultural programs, and content development projects aimed at providing American audiences an opportunity to learn more about other cultures.

Flagship Events

Meridian Ball 
Since the first Meridian Ball in 1969, the event has withstood changes of presidential administrations, times of national and economic crisis, and societal upheaval—and is still one of the few Washington events where diplomats, government and business leaders from across parties, borders and backgrounds set aside differences and forge relationships that catalyze collaboration. The Meridian Ball is a nonpartisan, fundraising event that capitalizes on the richness and splendor of Meridian’s two mansions. By bringing together this network of leaders in government, business, the diplomatic corps and the arts, the Meridian Ball showcases the value of cross-sector collaboration and leadership. The latter precedes the Ball to form a full day of programming that highlights Meridian’s mission to strengthen engagement between the U.S. and the world through diplomacy, global leadership and culture.

Meridian Global Leadership Summit 
Founded in 2011, the Meridian Global Leadership Summit convenes diplomatic, business and government leaders in a neutral, nonpartisan forum to exchange ideas and collaborate on solutions to the challenges and opportunities of a rapidly globalizing world.

Meridian Global Leadership Awards 
The Meridian Global Leadership Awards honors those who, by their actions and practices, exemplify the positive impact individual and corporate leaders can have in their communities and the world. These individuals are champions of the organization’s belief that all citizens can be global leaders and they share Meridian International Center’s commitment to promote international understanding through the exchange of ideas, people, and culture.

Diplomacy Forum 
Meridian’s annual Diplomacy Forum gathers American and international diplomats, military officials, business leaders, policy experts to explore trends and challenges in U.S. and international statecraft.  Each year, the Forum employs featured speakers and a series of panel discussions to explore a particular country or region’s cultures and how they can pave the way for increased engagement and economic opportunities with the United States. Recent programs have explored diplomacy and foreign policy related to outer space, the Arctic, the ocean, climate change, global health, cyber security/disinformation, and equity and inclusion. During the 2021 Diplomacy Forum, the organization launched the DiplomacyRISE initiative, aimed to support the career development of college students and young professionals by welcoming them to participate alongside established global affairs practitioners.

Culturefix 
Founded in 2021, culturefix, is the organization’s inaugural cultural diplomacy celebration which honors the power of the arts and cultures to help fix global challenges faced by people, communities and the planet. The program features conversations at the intersection of diplomacy, culture, and the arts, the announcement of the Meridian Cultural Diplomacy Awards, and special performances.

Meridian Cultural Diplomacy Awards 
The Meridian Cultural Diplomacy Awards are bestowed on artists or cultural leaders who demonstrate an ongoing commitment to using the arts and culture to unite people in the United States and around the world and contribute to greater international cooperation on shared global challenges.

References

External links 
 

"Meridian International Center Delves Into Cultural Exchange Between the U.S. and India". www.washdiplomat.com. Retrieved 2018-05-02.
"Meridian International Center Hosts 1st Emirati Touring Art Exhibit - K Street Magazine". K Street Magazine. 2014-05-28. Retrieved 2018-05-02.
"Meridian Global Leadership Summit & Women Entrepreneurs | Elegant Entrepreneur". elegantentrepreneur.co. Retrieved 2018-05-02.
"Meridian summit addresses global crisis". www.washdiplomat.com. Retrieved 2018-05-02.
Center, Meridian International. "Diplomats, Leaders of Microsoft, Barclays, and the U.S. Department of State Discuss the Changing Dynamics of Power and Leadership at the Meridian Global Leadership Summit, October 18, 2013". www.prnewswire.com. Retrieved 2018-05-02.
Pan-Africa Youth Leadership Program | U.S. Embassy in Malawi". U.S. Embassy in Malawi. Retrieved 2018-05-02.
"Meridian Global Leadership Awards". Retrieved 2018-05-02.
http://www.newyorkcool.com, New York Cool,. "New York Cool - Meridian Global Leadership Awards". www.newyorkcool.com. Retrieved 2018-05-02.
Global Leadership Goes Glam At 48th Annual Meridian Ball | Washingtonian". Washingtonian. 2016-10-18. Retrieved 2018-05-02.
Organization, Entrepreneurs'. "Entrepreneurs' Organization to Support Young Leaders of the Americas Initiative Entrepreneurship Fellows Program". www.prnewswire.com. Retrieved 2018-05-02.

Non-profit organizations based in Washington, D.C.
Organizations established in 1960
1960 establishments in Washington, D.C.